This was the first edition of the event.

Arnaud Boetsch and Olivier Delaître won the title, defeating Ivan Lendl and Christo van Rensburg 6–3, 7–6 in the final.

Seeds

  Tom Nijssen /  Cyril Suk (first round)
  Steve DeVries /  David Macpherson (first round)
  Boris Becker /  Jakob Hlasek (first round)
  Patrik Kühnen /  Diego Nargiso (quarterfinals)

Draw

Draw

References

External links
Main draw on ATP archive

Open 13
1993 ATP Tour